Macropus pearsoni is an extinct Australian vertebrate species belonging to the family Macropodidae, and is in the same genus (Macropus) as extant kangaroos. M. pearsoni lived during the Pleistocene. It is known from fossil mandibles collected from Pleistocene beds from the Darling Downs in New South Wales, Lake Kanunka in northeastern South Australia, and the Cape York Peninsula. it reached a size similar to Macropus titan, which is a mass of 150 kg.

References

Prehistoric macropods
Prehistoric mammals of Australia
Pleistocene marsupials
Fossil taxa described in 1971